Nicholas Paul Scutari (born November 18, 1968) is an American politician and attorney who is the 115th and current President of the New Jersey Senate. A member of the Democratic Party, he has served in the New Jersey Senate since 2004, representing the 22nd Legislative District. He has held the position of Senate President since 2022.

Early life
Scutari attended Union County College, received a B.A. from Kean University in Psychology, an Ed.M. from Rutgers University in Education and a J.D. from the Western Michigan University Cooley Law School. He is an attorney with the Law Offices of Nicholas P. Scutari.

Political career
Before his election the Senate, Scutari was a member of the Union County Board of Chosen Freeholders, where he became the youngest Freeholder Chairman in county history. He served as Freeholder Chairman in 1999, after serving a year as Freeholder Vice Chairman. Prior to being a freeholder, he served as a member of the Board of Education in Linden.

New Jersey Senate 
He was nominated for the Senate after Senator Joseph Suliga announced that he would not seek re-election after a female casino employee in Atlantic City accused him of sexual harassment.

Senator Scutari has served on the State Government Committee (as Chair), the Joint State Leasing and Space Utilization Committee, the Commerce Committee and the Judiciary Committee. Senator Scutari has held the role of Chair of the New Jersey Senate Committee on Judiciary for the longest period in modern history.  He is a former Commissioner of the New Jersey Clean Elections Commission. He is also a former Vice Chairman of the Senate Education Committee. He now heads the Senate Judiciary Committee. Senator Scutari was the chief sponsor of New Jersey's Medical Marijuana law that was signed into law in 2009 and has been an advocate for the effort to legalize marijuana for all individuals over the age of 21. After a bill he introduced failed in 2014, Scutari introduced a bill in May 2017 to legalize, regulate and tax recreational marijuana use; while then-Governor of New Jersey Chris Christie was vigorously opposed to the measure, incoming governor Phil Murphy had announced that he would support legalization.

Committees 
Judiciary
Joint State Leasing and Space Utilization Committee
Commerce

District 22 
Each of the 40 districts in the New Jersey Legislature has one representative in the New Jersey Senate and two members in the New Jersey General Assembly. The representatives from the 22nd District for the 2022—23 Legislative Session are:
Senator Nicholas Scutari (D) 
Assemblywoman Linda S. Carter (D) 
Assemblyman James J. Kennedy (D)

Acting Governor of New Jersey
On June 4, 2022, Senate President Scutari was sworn in as the Acting Governor of New Jersey as both Governor Phil Murphy and Lieutenant Governor Shelia Oliver were out of state on personal trips.

Linden municipal prosecutor
Concurrent with his senatorship, Scutari was Municipal Prosecutor for the city of Linden, New Jersey until he was ousted from the position in January 2020 for absence at court hearings. He contested the report which cited that he did not appear more than 50% of the time and is suing the city.

Family 
In Italy, his cousin Donato Scutari, a member of the Italian Communist Party,  was elected Deputy and Senator of the Italian Republic.  His uncle, Anthony Scutari, was chair of the Union County Improvement Authority.

Electoral history

New Jersey Senate

References

External links
Senator Scutari's legislative webpage, New Jersey Legislature
New Jersey Legislature financial disclosure forms
2016 2015 2014 2013 2012 2011 2010 2009 2008 2007 2006 2005 2004
Senator Nicholas P. Scutari, Project Vote Smart

|-

1968 births
21st-century American politicians
American people of Arbëreshë descent
County commissioners in New Jersey
American people of Italian descent
Kean University alumni
Lawyers from Newark, New Jersey
Living people
Democratic Party New Jersey state senators
People from Linden, New Jersey
Politicians from Newark, New Jersey
Presidents of the New Jersey Senate
Rutgers University alumni
Western Michigan University Cooley Law School alumni
Union College (New Jersey) alumni